Juan Manuel Cerúndolo was the defending champion and successfully defended his title, defeating Jesper de Jong 6–3, 2–6, 6–2 in the final.

Seeds

Draw

Finals

Top half

Bottom half

References

External links
Main draw
Qualifying draw

Challenger de Tigre II - 1